Monte Pian Nave is a mountain located in Lombardy, Italy. It has an elevation of 1,058 metres above sea level. It is part of the Varese Prealps subgroup of the Lugano Prealps.

Mountains of Lombardy
Mountains of the Alps